Shibley is a surname. Notable people with the surname include:

 Arkie Shibley (1914–1975), American country singer
 Gail Shibley (born  1958), American politician
 Schuyler Shibley (1820–1890), Canadian businessman and politician
 William Shibley (1876–1926), American football coach

See also
 Sibley (surname)